Giovanni Bernardo Carboni (12 May 1614 – 11 March 1683) (also Carbone) was an Italian painter of the Baroque period.

Biography
He was born in Albaro, near Genoa. He became a pupil of Giovanni Andrea de Ferrari and he was likely a contemporary in the studio with two other Ferrari pupils: Giovanni Benedetto Castiglione and Giovanni Andrea Podesta. Other influences on his style came from trips to Venice of c. 1643–4 and 1650, his friendships with Valerio Castello and Casone, as well as the contact with his prolific brother and painter, Giovanni Battista Carlone.

He best known as a portrait painter, usually in full-length or three quarters view; his portraits are mainly of aristocracy dressed in full regalia or shown amid items of their property in the manner of Anthony van Dyck.  He died at Genoa.

Bibliography

 Portrait of aristocrat, L'Archimede Gallery of Art, Rome
 Madonna con il Bambino dormiente Museo Palazzo Rosso, Genoa 
Artnet biography from Grove Encyclopedia of Art
 Domenico Sedini, Giovanni Bernardo Carbone, online catalogue Artgate by Fondazione Cariplo, 2010, CC BY-SA.

Other projects

1614 births
1683 deaths
17th-century Genoese people
17th-century Italian painters
Italian male painters
Painters from Genoa
Italian Baroque painters